Il petomane, internationally released as Petomaniac, is a 1983 Italian commedia all'italiana film directed by Pasquale Festa Campanile. It is loosely based on real life events of Joseph Pujol, best known as "Le Pétomane".

Cast 
 Ugo Tognazzi: Joseph Pujol
 Mariangela Melato: Catherine Dumurier
 Ricky Tognazzi: Michel Pujol
 Gianmarco Tognazzi: Lucien Pujol
 Stefano Roffi: Marc Pujol
 Giovanni Grimaldi: Louis Pujol
 Giuliana Calandra: Giulia Pujol
 Vittorio Caprioli: Pitalugue
 Anna Maria Gherardi: Misia Edwards
 Peter Berling: Ziedler 
 Sergio Solli: Montesquieu
 Felice Andreasi: Lawyer Mercier 
 Enzo Robutti : Giudice Istruttore 
 Pietro Tordi: Prince d'Orleans

References

External links

1983 films
Commedia all'italiana
Italian comedy films
1983 comedy films
Films directed by Pasquale Festa Campanile
Films scored by Carlo Rustichelli
1980s Italian-language films
1980s Italian films